Rachmat Nadi Witoelar Kartaadipoetra or Rachmat Witoelar (born June 2, 1941 in Tasikmalaya, West Java) was the State Minister of Environment of Indonesia in 2004-2009.

Witoelar graduated with a degree in architecture from the Bandung Institute of Technology (ITB) in 1970. In 1971, he became a Member of Parliament representing the ruling party, Golkar. He was re-elected four times. In 2004, he became an active member of presidential candidate Susilo Bambang Yudhoyono's campaign team. When Yudhoyono was elected President, Witoelar was appointed State Minister of Environment.

Rachmat has held various positions in the House of Representatives, including chairman of House Commission V and Commission VI. He was also Golkar Party secretary-general from 1988 to 1993. He served as Indonesian ambassador to Russia and Mongolia from 1993 to 1997.

Witoelar is married to Erna Witoelar. They have three sons. Witoelar was also elected as the president of Thirteenth United Nations Framework Climate Change Conference (UNFCCC 2007) which was held in Bali, Indonesia.

External links
 Profile at TokohIndonesia

1941 births
Bandung Institute of Technology alumni
Living people
People from Tasikmalaya
Environment ministers of Indonesia
Sundanese people
Golkar politicians
Ambassadors of Indonesia to Russia
Ambassadors of Indonesia to Mongolia